Allman Bay is an arm of Nares Strait, in the Qikiqtaaluk Region of Nunavut, Canada. It is located in eastern Ellesmere Island, southwest of the southern edge of the Darling Peninsula. Cape Prescott is the headland to the west of the entrance.

Exploration
Admiral Sir George Nares explored the bay during his voyage of 1875–1876.

During the period of August 18, 1898, through August 2, 1899, American explorer Robert Peary's ship was ice-bound in Allman Bay.

References

Bays of Qikiqtaaluk Region
Ellesmere Island